{|
{{Infobox ship image
|Ship image=Guillaume Tell PU5634.jpg
|Ship caption=Capture of the William Tell, by Robert Dodd
}}

|}

HMS Malta was an 80-gun third rate ship of the line of the Royal Navy. Having served the French for less than four years from her completion in July 1796 to her capture in March 1800, she would eventually serve the British for forty years.

 Guillaume Tell  took part in the Battle of the Nile, but formed part of the rear of the French fleet and saw little action. She became one of only two French ships of the line to escape the destruction of the fleet, and took refuge at Malta. She was trapped there by the British blockade, and as the island began to fall to the British, she attempted to escape. She was spotted by a patrolling British frigate and attacked, with nearby British ships of the line joining the action. After a fierce fight she struck her colours and was taken over by the British. Renamed HMS Malta after the island she was captured off she served in the Channel, the Atlantic and the Mediterranean. She fought with Vice-Admiral Robert Calder's fleet at the Battle of Cape Finisterre in 1805, contributing to the capture of two enemy ships. Transferred to take part in the blockade of the French ports, she helped in the chase and capture of the French frigate Président in 1806. The last years of the war were spent as a flagship in the Mediterranean, after which she returned to Britain. She spent some time as the Plymouth guardship, and remained on active service until being reduced to a harbour depot ship, in which role she spent nearly a decade. She was finally broken up in 1840, forty years after her capture from the French.

Construction and French career

NileGuillaume Tell was built to a design by Jacques-Noël Sané at the Toulon shipyard between September 1794 and July 1796, having been launched on 21 October 1795. She was named after the folk hero William Tell. Flagship of Rear-Admiral Pierre-Charles Villeneuve she was one of the ships that accompanied Vice-Admiral François-Paul Brueys's fleet, carrying Napoleon Bonaparte and the French troops to invade Egypt. Guillaume Tell was anchored with Brueys's fleet in Aboukir Bay on 1 August, when they were discovered in the evening by a British fleet under Rear-Admiral Horatio Nelson. Nelson ordered his fleet to attack immediately, with the British forces moving on the French van, doubling their line. Brueys was taken by surprise, having expected the British to attack his rear and centre, where he had consequently placed his heaviest ships, including the Guillaume Tell. Guillaume Tell formed part of the rear division and therefore remained out of the engagement until dawn, as the French van surrendered and the British ships moved down the line to engage the remaining ships.

Villeneuve was later criticised for not using his initiative to bring the rear to support the van earlier in the attack, but pleaded that it would not have made a difference to the outcome. The four surviving French ships escaped to Malta, with Généreux returning from there to Toulon, but Guillaume Tell became trapped at Valletta  by the British blockade.

Capture

Nelson's irritation that two of the French ships of the line at the Nile had escaped him was assuaged by interception of the Généreux in February 1800 while trying to protect a squadron attempting to break the blockade of Malta. Nelson wrote in a letter to Emma Hamilton 'I have got her - Le Genereux - thank God! 12 out of the 13, only the Guillaume Tell remaining: I am after the others.' Généreux was captured after a brief action, surrendering to Nelson's flag captain, Edward Berry. Nelson, by now infatuated with Emma Hamilton, and resisting his commanding officer Lord Keith's order to move his base of operations away from Palermo, left the blockade to his subordinates while he went ashore. While he was away, Guillaume Tell prepared for sea and got under way from Valletta at 11 at night on 29 March, flying the flag of Rear-Admiral Denis Decrès. Her departure was observed by Captain Henry Blackwood aboard the frigate , who immediately engaged her, having dispatched the brig Minorca to bring up the rest of the blockading squadron.

By dawn on 30 March the 64-gun  had closed and the two exchanged fire, with Lions bowsprit becoming entangled in Guillaume Tells rigging. The crew of Lion fought off two attempts to board by the French, before drifting away with her sails and rigging cut to pieces in order to repair the damage. Edward Berry's  came up at 6 in the morning, and after ordering Guillaume Tell to surrender, fired a broadside. Guillaume Tell had had her main and mizzen top masts shot away by Penelope, but resisted Foudroyant. The two ships exchanged broadsides while Penelope ranged up on Guillaume Tells un-engaged quarter and opened fire. Now engaged on both sides, Guillaume Tell lost her foremast at 6.36 am, and her mainmast at 6.45 am. At about this time a French seaman nailed the French ensign to the stump of the mizzen-mast. Now engaged by all three British ships, the French ship fought on for another two hours, until completely dismasted and obliged to close her lower gunports to stop them flooding as the ship rolled helplessly. Realising that further resistance was useless, Decrès ordered the colours to be struck at 9.35 am.

British career

The badly damaged Guillaume Tell was taken in tow by Penelope, the only ship in any condition to remain at sea and arrived at Syracuse on 3 April. After being patched up she was sailed to Britain, arriving at Portsmouth on 23 November 1800. She was surveyed and fitted out there, a process completed by July 1801, during which time she was commissioned as HMS Malta in May under Captain Albemarle Bertie. She initially based in the roadstead off St Helens, but was damaged in a serious fire in April 1802 and was paid off for repairs.  After these were completed she recommissioned in March 1803,on the outbreak of war, under the command of Captain Edward Buller. Buller was temporarily replaced in January 1805 by Captain William Granger for service off Cadiz, but Buller was back in command in time to take part in Calder's Action off Cape Finisterre on 22 July 1805. Malta formed the rear-most ship in the British line in the approach to the battle, but as the fleets became confused in the failing light and thick patchy fog, Buller found that he was surrounded by five enemy ships. After a fierce engagement in which Malta suffered five killed and forty wounded, Buller forced the Spanish 84-gun San Rafael to strike, and afterwards sent the Maltas boats to take possession of the Spanish 74-gun Firme.Malta became the flagship of Rear-Admiral Sir Thomas Louis in August 1806, and was still serving with Louis' squadron when they were ordered to intercept a French force under Jean-Baptiste Philibert Willaumez that was expected to arrive in European waters from the Caribbean. On 27 September they came across the 44-gun French frigate Président, and after a pursuit, forced her to surrender. Malta departed for the Mediterranean on 5 January 1807 and spent the year participating in the blockade of Cadiz, with Buller being succeeded in command by Captain William Shield during the year. She blockaded Toulon in 1808, at first under Shield, and later under Captain Robert Otway. Returning home to Britain in December that year, she was paid off. Work began on a large repair at Plymouth in July 1809, after which she was fitted out for foreign service, a process completed by December 1811. She had recommissioned in September 1811 under the command of Captain Charles Paget to serve as the flagship of Rear-Admiral Sir Benjamin Hallowell in the Mediterranean. Malta sailed from Britain on 8 January 1812, and spent the next few years in the Mediterranean, passing under the command of Captain William Charles Fahie in January 1815. Fahie was in command of Malta when she took part in the successful attack on the Fortress of Gaeta during the July and August 1815.

With the end of the Napoleonic Wars she returned to Britain, where various defects were repaired and she was fitted out as the Plymouth guardship between November 1815 and January 1816. Captain Thomas Caulfield took command in January 1816 and remained in her until she was paid off in July 1816. Malta'' remained in active service until being fitted as a reserve depot ship at Plymouth in late 1831. She spent another nine years in the role until being broken up at Plymouth in August 1840.

Notes

References

External links

 

Ships of the line of the Royal Navy
1795 ships
Ships built in France